Moingi is an unclassified Bantu language on the right bank of the Congo River opposite the town of Basoko in the Democratic Republic of Congo. It is situated among several Soko–Kele languages, and is quite close to a few Bwa languages, but it is not known if it is particularly closely related to any of them.

References

Soko-Kele languages